Michael Andrew Fitts (born March 1, 1953) is an American legal scholar who is the current president of Tulane University in New Orleans, Louisiana, and the Judge Rene H. Himel Professor of Law at the Tulane School of Law. He is a former Dean of the University of Pennsylvania Law School. He is also the author of numerous articles that have appeared in the Harvard Law Journal and other prestigious scholarly publications.

Personal life
His father, Doctor William T. Fitts, Jr., was a John Rhea Barton Professor and Chairman of the Department of Surgery at Penn Medicine from 1972 through 1975. Dr. Fitts served in World War II as a surgical ward officer in the Affiliated Unit of the University of Pennsylvania, the 20th General Hospital, stationed in the China-Burma-India Theatre. Fitts' maternal grandfather, Joseph H. Willits, Ph.D., LL.D., was a professor and dean of the Wharton School.

Michael Fitts and his wife, Renée J. Sobel, Esq., have two daughters.

Academic career
Fitts earned a bachelor of arts degree from Harvard College in 1975. Inspired by To Kill a Mockingbird and its heroic protagonist Atticus Finch, he attended Yale Law School. Fitts was editor of the Yale Law Journal and received his Juris Doctor in 1979.

Fitts served as a clerk for federal judge and civil rights advocate Leon Higginbotham, who became a mentor to him. He then worked as an attorney in the U.S. Justice Department's Office of Legal Counsel, where he served as outside counsel to the President, White House and Cabinet.

His teaching career began at the University of Pennsylvania Law School in 1985. Fitts served 14 years as dean of the University of Pennsylvania Law School, from 2000 to 2014, where he was recognized for greatly increasing the school's offerings in interdisciplinary education.  He also presided over a quadrupling of Penn Law's endowment, a more than 40 percent increase in the size of the Law School faculty and a doubling of all forms of student financial aid.  Fitts also oversaw the rebuilding or renovation of the entire Law School campus. In recognition of his accomplishments, the Penn Law School's Board of Overseers named a faculty chair, a scholarship and an auditorium at the school in his honor.

Fitts has written extensively on presidential power, separation of powers, executive branch decision-making, improving the structure of political parties and administrative law. He served as president of the American Law Deans Association.

Tulane Presidency
Arriving at Tulane in July 2014, Fitts brought with him a strong emphasis on heightening cross-disciplinary education and research. He believes students and universities can set themselves apart in a fast-changing world and ever-shifting economy through teaching and research that address societal problems from an array of different fields and areas of knowledge. In his first year at Tulane, Michael Fitts launched task forces to lead the university in deepening its unique strengths for interdisciplinary collaboration. He has capitalized on Tulane University's manageable size, its wide selection of professional schools, the unified undergraduate college and multiple cross-disciplinary efforts already in place. He aims to create the most engaged undergraduate experience in the country through this rethinking of academic options, residential living, extracurricular activities and more. In graduate education and research, his goal is to foster intellectual cross-pollination that can produce solutions to some of the world's most fundamental problems. President Fitts received his highest approval rating in May 2018 at 97.3%.

Fitts has initiated a campus master planning process with a 21st century vision of spaces redesigned to promote connections. That includes drawing people together from different parts of campus and linking different functions of the university, such as residence halls with dining hubs and academic venues.

Another avenue for making connections is public service, an area where Tulane University is a leader in higher education. Fitts lauds the pursuit of community service for its power to show students how theory connects with practice and gives them real-world experience in the concepts they study in class. His vision for the university includes enhancing the ties between public service and academics.

Awards and honors
 Beacon Award for Public Service (2014) 
 Urban Leadership Award, Urban Institute (2014) 
 Michael A. Fitts Distinguished Professor of Law (2013) 
 Named one of the "Nine Most Transformative U.S. Law Deans" over the past decade, Brian Leiter's Law School Report (2011)
 Friends Select School Distinguished Alumni/ae Award (2007)

Board and leadership positions
 President, American Law Deans Association/Society (Member, Board of Directors 2003-2013; Vice-President 2009-11; President 2011-2013)
 Organizer & Convener, Sino-U.S. Law Deans Summit, Beijing, PRC (June 2011) (at the request of then US Ambassador to China, Jon Huntsman)
 Chair, The Holmes Debates and Conference, Library of Congress (2004)
 Co-Chair, American Bar Association Bi-Annual Development Conference (2005-2007; Member Organizing Committee, 2005-2010)
 Member, American Bar Association Review Committees-Reaccreditation Site Visiting Committees for University of Chicago (April 2012); Stanford Law School (2008); Boston College Law School (2006)-Security of Position Drafting Committee (2008)
 Member, American Political Science Association and APSA Study Group on Law and the Political Process (1992-2010)
 Member, American Law Institute (2000-2014 as Dean; 2009-present as public member)
 Member of Organizing Committee and Faculty, New Deans Conference, ABA (2004-2008)
 Member, Academic Advisory Board, Waseda Law School, Tokyo Japan (2004-2010)
 Member, Board of Directors, World Affairs Council (2005-2009)
 Member, Academic Advisory Board, The Reinvestment Fund (2005-2014)
 Member, Law Deans Advisory Board on China (2006-2010)
 Member, Board of Advisors for the Skadden, Arps Honors Program in Legal Studies at The City College of New York (2008-2010)
 Member, Board of Directors, Leonard Davis Institute of Health Economics (2011-2014)
 Member, Committee of Seventy, Watchdog Citizens Group (1999-2008)

Publications
 In Memoriam: Bernard Wolfman, 125 Harv. L. Rev. (June 2012)
 What Will Our Future Look Like and How Will We Respond?, 96 Iowa L. Rev. 1539   (2011) (Part of a Symposium on Rethinking Legal Education)
 A Time-Honored Model for the Profession and the Academy, 158 U. Pa. L. Rev. 1289 (2010) (Tribute to Prof. Geoffrey C. Hazard, Jr.)
 A Dean's Perspective on Ed Baker, 12 U. Pa. J. Const. L. 943 (2010) (Tribute to C. Edwin Baker)
 The Non-Management Side of Academic Administration, 41 U. Tol. L. Rev. 283 (2010) (Part of Symposium on Leadership in Legal Education)
 Forward: The Evolution of International Law, 30 U. Pa. J. Int. L. xix (2009) (Part of 20th Anniversary Issue of the Penn Journal of International Law)
 Targeted Transparency, 7 Election Law Journal 137 (2008) (reviewing Archon Fung et al. FULL DISCLOSURE: THE PERILS AND PROMISE OF TRANSPARENCY (2007))
 Back to the Future: The Supreme Court's Response to the Changing Goals and Functions of Modern Political Parties in THE SUPREME COURT AND THE ELECTORAL PROCESS (David Hope ed.) (2002)
 The Complicated Ingredients of Wisdom and Leadership, 16 Harv. Bl.L.L.Rev. 17 (2000) (Part of Symposium on Work of A. Leon Higginbotham, Jr.)
 The Hazards of Legal Fine Tuning: Confronting the Free Will Problem in Election Law Scholarship, 32 Loyola Law Review 1121 (1999) (Part of Symposium on Election Law as its own Field of Study)
 The Legalization of the Modern Presidency: Twenty Five Years After Watergate, 43 St. Louis U. L.J. 725 (1999) (Part of Symposium on Watergate 25 years later) 
 Devins and Fitts, The Triumph of Timing: Raines v. Byrd and the Modern Supreme Court's Attempt to Control Constitutional Confrontations 86 Geo.L.J.  351 (1998)
 The Foibles of Formalism: A Political "Transaction Cost" Analysis of Separation of Powers, 47 Case West L. Rev. 1643 (1998) (Part of Law and Political Science Symposium on Presidency)
 The Paradox of Power in the Modern State: Why a Unitary Centralized Presidency May Not Exhibit Effective or Legitimate Leadership, 144 U.Pa.L.Rev. 827 (1996)
 Review of Cox and McCubbins, LEGISLATIVE LEVIATHAN, 13 J. of Pol.Anal. and  Mgmt. 811 (1994)
 Review of Bruce Ackerman, WE THE PEOPLE, 12 Journal of Pol.Anal. and Mgmt. 223 (1993)
 Ways of Thinking About the Unitary Executive, 15 Cardozo L.Rev. 323 (1993) (Part of Symposium on the Unitary Executive)
 Review of Cass Sunstein, AFTER THE RIGHTS REVOLUTION – RECONCEIVING THE REGULATORY STATE, 11 Journal of Pol.Anal.and Mgmt. 332 (1992)
 Fitts and Inman, Controlling Congress:  Presidential Influence in Domestic Fiscal Policy, 80 Geo.L.J. 1737 (1992) (Part of Symposium on Law and Political Theory)
 Review of James Fishkin, DEMOCRACY AND DELIBERATION, 10 Constit. Com. 194 (1992)
 Can Ignorance Be Bliss?  Imperfect Information as a Positive Influence in Political Institutions, 88 Mich.L.Rev.917 (1990)
 Inman and Fitts, Political Institutions and Fiscal Policy: Evidence from the U.S. Historical Record, 6 J.L. Econ. & Org. 79 (1990) (Part of Yale Law School Symposium  on Political Institutions)
 Retaining the Rule of Law in a Chevron World, 66 Chi.Kent L.Rev.355 (1990) (Part of Symposium on Statutory Construction)
 Look Before You Leap: Some Cautionary Notes on Civic Republicanism, 97 Yale L.J. 1651 (1988) (Part of Symposium on the Republican Civic Tradition)
 The Vices of Virtue: A Political Party Perspective on Civic Virtue Reforms of the Legislative Process, 136 U. Pa. L.Rev. 1567 (1988)

References

External links
 Official bio

1953 births
Living people
Deans of University of Pennsylvania Law School
Presidents of Tulane University
University of Pennsylvania faculty
Harvard College alumni
Yale Law School alumni
Lawyers from Philadelphia